Ruy de Carvalho GCM (born 1 March 1927) is a Portuguese actor.

Career 
He is one of the most renowned Portuguese actors of all time, and is still active as an artist. For being a role model to young artists, he was awarded with the 2013 Active Aging Award in the "Arts" category.

Selected filmography

References

External links

 

1927 births
Living people
Male actors from Lisbon
Portuguese male film actors
Portuguese male television actors